Zdenka Bergrová (née Vovsová; 10 March 1923, in Prague – 22 May 2008, in Prague) was a Czech poet and translator. She was best known for her children's plays, epigrams, fairy tales, and translations of works from Russian, Ukrainian, French, and English.

References

1923 births
2008 deaths
Writers from Prague
Czech poets
Czech translators